Horsfordia alata, with the common names pink velvet mallow and  pink velvetmallow, is a shrubby desert plant in the mallow family (Malvaceae).

Distribution
The plant is endemic to the Sonoran Desert ecoregion, in the Colorado Desert sub-ecoregion of southern California and in southwestern Arizona; and in Sonora and Baja California states of northwestern Mexico.

See also
 Flora of the Sonoran Desert

References

External links
Calflora Database: Horsfordia alata (Pink velvet mallow)
 Jepson Manual eFlora (TJM2) treatment of Horsfordia alata
USDA Plants Profile for Horsfordia alata (pink velvetmallow)
UC Photos gallery of Horsfordia alata

Malveae
Flora of the Sonoran Deserts
Flora of the California desert regions
Flora of Arizona
Flora of Baja California
Flora of Sonora
Natural history of the Colorado Desert
Taxa named by Asa Gray
Flora without expected TNC conservation status